The Journey is a 1942 Argentine film directed by Francisco Múgica.

Plot
The film tells the story of a young engineer (Roberto Airaldi) from Buenos Aires who met a girl (Mirtha Legrand) at Córdoba Province falling in love with her; but her mother (Ana Arneodo) and her sisters (Aída Luz, Silvana Roth) don't agree with their feelings and they do all that they can for separate them, but at the end he discover why.

Cast
 Mirtha Legrand
 Roberto Airaldi 
 Silvana Roth
 Ana Arneodo
 Aída Luz
 Tito Gómez

References

External links
 

1942 films
1940s Spanish-language films
Argentine black-and-white films
Films directed by Francisco Múgica
Argentine drama films
1942 drama films
1940s Argentine films